Alex Weir may refer to:

 Alex Weir (cricketer) (1921–2006), Australian cricketer
 Alex Weir (musician), American guitarist
 Alex Weir (footballer, born 1916) (1916–2003), Scottish footballer
 Alex Weir (footballer, born 1879), Scottish footballer
 Alex Weir (soccer), Scottish-American soccer player